The 2003–04 Gonzaga Bulldogs men's basketball team represented Gonzaga University in the NCAA men's Division I competition.

Preseason

Departures

Incoming Transfers

2003 Recruiting Class

Roster

Schedule

|-
!colspan=9| Regular Season

|-
!colspan=9| 2004 West Coast Conference tournament

|-
!colspan=9| NCAA Division I men's basketball tournament

References

Gonzaga Bulldogs
Gonzaga Bulldogs men's basketball seasons
Gonzaga Bulldogs men's basketball
Gonzaga Bulldogs men's basketball
Gonzaga